Lara Arruabarrena and Tatjana Maria were the reigning champions, but chose not to participate.

Choi Ji-hee and Han Na-lae won the title, defeating Valentini Grammatikopoulou and Réka Luca Jani in the final, 6–4, 6–4.

Seeds

Draw

Draw

References
Main Draw

Korea Open - Doubles
2021 Doubles